The third season of Pretty Little Liars, based on the books of the same name by Sara Shepard, premiered on June 5, 2012, on ABC Family and concluded on March 19, 2013. On November 29, 2011, ABC Family renewed the series for a third season, consisting of 24 episodes. 

On October 4, 2012, ABC Family renewed the series for a fourth season, consisting of 24 episodes.

Overview
The third season takes place five months following the discovery that Mona Vanderwaal (Janel Parrish) was the elusive "A" that had been creatively and relentlessly tormenting the four main characters, Aria Montgomery (Lucy Hale), Spencer Hastings (Troian Bellisario), Hanna Marin (Ashley Benson), and Emily Fields (Shay Mitchell) for the past year. The first half of the season addresses the issue of whether or not Garrett Reynolds (Yani Gellman) actually killed or was involved in the murder of the girls' former friend and queen bee, Alison DiLaurentis (Sasha Pieterse) and who killed Maya St. Germain (Bianca Lawson) in the season two finale, while the second half deals with the reveal that Toby Cavanaugh (Keegan Allen) is a member of the A-Team. While dealing with Maya's death Emily finds comfort with Paige McCullers (Lindsey Shaw) and the two enter a relationship. The girls see the arrival of CeCe Drake (Vanessa Ray) to Rosewood, a sister like figure to Alison. Spencer discovering the information about Toby sends her on a dark path, until Mona fakes Toby's death, which sends Spencer completely over the edge, leading to her being admitted to Radley. 

All this time, the girls continue to see Red Coat, a mysterious blonde in a red trench coat who is believed to be the leader of the A-Team. Mona visits Spencer at Radley and offers her the chance to join the A-Team, which Spencer, who wants answers on Toby, accepts. Spencer is released from Radley and comes home, but is unbeknownst to the girls, working with Mona/"A" to set up a party so that Red Coat can meet them all. As promised, Mona arranges Spencer a meeting with Toby, who is alive and well and reveals that he joined the A-Team to keep Spencer safe. Spencer and Toby then begin working on the inside to discover Red Coat's identity at the party. Red Coat flies in on a plane and Spencer and Toby go into the woods to watch her, while the girls corner Mona, as someone locks them inside the Lodge and sets it on fire. Spencer loses Red Coat in the woods, as the Lodge burns down with the girls inside. Hanna, unconscious, wakes up briefly, as she is pulled out of the Lodge by Red Coat, whom she sees as Alison DiLaurentis.

Cast

Main cast
 Troian Bellisario as Spencer Hastings
 Ashley Benson as Hanna Marin
 Tyler Blackburn as Caleb Rivers
 Holly Marie Combs as Ella Montgomery
 Lucy Hale as Aria Montgomery
 Ian Harding as Ezra Fitz 
 Laura Leighton as Ashley Marin
 Chad Lowe as Byron Montgomery
 Shay Mitchell as Emily Fields
 Janel Parrish as Mona Vanderwaal
 Sasha Pieterse as Alison DiLaurentis

Recurring cast
 Keegan Allen as Toby Cavanaugh
 Lindsey Shaw as Paige McCullers
 Bryce Johnson as Darren Wilden
 Julian Morris as Wren Kingston
 Tammin Sursok as Jenna Marshall
 Torrey DeVitto as Melissa Hastings
 Lesley Fera as Veronica Hastings
 Drew Van Acker as Jason DiLaurentis
 Edward Kerr as Ted Wilson
Sterling Sulieman as Lyndon James/"Nate St. Germain
Vanessa Ray as CeCe Drake
 Brendan Robinson as Lucas Gottesman
 Nia Peeples as Pam Fields
 Yani Gellman as Garrett Reynolds

Guest cast
 Bianca Lawson as Maya St. Germain
 Missy Franklin as herself
 Adam Lambert as himself
 Amanda Schull as Meredith Sorenson
 Gregg Sulkin as Wesley Fitzgerald
 Téo Briones as Malcolm Cutler
 Aeriél Miranda as Shana Fring
 Brant Daugherty as Noel Kahn
 Steve Talley as Zack
 Larisa Oleynik as Maggie Cutler
 Bernard Curry as Jamie Doyle
 Jim Titus as Officer Barry Maple
 Annabeth Gish as Anne Sullivan
 Mary Page Keller as Dianne Fitzgerald
 Brandon W. Jones as Andrew Campbell
 Reggie Austin as Eddie Lamb
Andrew Elvis Miller as Miles Corwin
 Nolan North as Peter Hastings
Jim Abele as Kenneth DiLaurentis
 Robbie Amell as Eric Kahn
 Flynn Morrison as Malcolm
Alexander Nifong as Sam

Episodes

Ratings

Live + SD ratings

DVD release

References 

2012 American television seasons
2013 American television seasons
Pretty Little Liars (franchise)